United Airlines Flight 175 was a domestic passenger flight that was hijacked by five al-Qaeda terrorists on September 11, 2001, as part of the September 11 attacks. The flight's scheduled plan was from Logan International Airport in Boston to Los Angeles International Airport in California. The Boeing 767-200 aircraft, carrying 65 passengers and crew, was deliberately crashed into the South Tower of the World Trade Center in New York City, killing all on-board instantly and causing the deaths of more than 600 people at or above the building's impact zone in addition to around 250 civilians and emergency personnel below. It was the second deadliest of the four crashes on the day in terms of both plane and ground casualties, surpassed only by American Airlines Flight 11.

Twenty-eight minutes into the flight, the hijackers injured several crew members, forcibly breached the cockpit, and murdered both pilots while forcing anyone who remained to the rear of the aircraft. Lead hijacker Marwan al-Shehhi, who had trained as a pilot for the purposes of the attacks, was able to usurp the flight controls once the captain and first officer were eliminated. Unlike Flight11, whose transponder was switched off, Flight175's transponder was visible on New York Center's radar, which depicted the aircraft's deviation from its assigned flight path for four minutes before air traffic controllers took notice at 08:51 EDT. Immediately thereafter, they made several unsuccessful attempts to contact the cockpit. In the 21 minutes between the hijacking and the crash, three people aboard made phone calls to family members and colleagues on the ground and relayed information regarding the hijackers as well as casualties suffered by passengers and crew.

Al-Shehhi flew the airplane into the South Tower at 09:03, in an attack coordinated with the hijacking of Flight 11, which struck the upper floors of North Tower 17 minutes earlier. News coverage of the crash into the North Tower led to Flight 175's impact being the only one of the four attacks to be televised live around the world. By 09:58, after 55 minutes of burning, the damage done to the South Tower by the crash and subsequent fire resulted in it being the first of the Twin Towers to collapse, killing everyone still inside the tower as it fell. During the recovery effort at the World Trade Center site, workers uncovered and identified remains from some Flight175 victims, but many victims have not been identified.

Background

Attacks 

The flight was hijacked as part of the September 11 attacks. The team was assembled by al-Qaeda leader Osama bin Laden, who also provided the financial and logistical support, and was led by Khalid Sheikh Mohammed who devised the plot. Bin Laden and Mohammed, along with the hijackers, were motivated by anti-US sentiment. The attacks were given the go ahead by bin Laden in late 1998 or early 1999. The World Trade Center was chosen as one of the targets due to it being a prominent American symbol that represented economic prowess.

Hijackers 

The team of hijackers on United Airlines Flight175 was led by Marwan al-Shehhi, originally from the United Arab Emirates with a stint in Hamburg, Germany as a student. By January 2001, the pilot hijackers had completed their training; Shehhi obtained a commercial pilot licence while training in South Florida, along with American Airlines Flight 11 hijacker Mohamed Atta and Flight93 hijacker Ziad Jarrah. The hijackers on Flight175 included Fayez Banihammad, also from the UAE, and three Saudis: brothers Hamza al-Ghamdi and Ahmed al-Ghamdi, as well as Mohand al-Shehri.

The hijackers were trained at an al-Qaeda camp called Mes Aynak in Kabul, Afghanistan, where they learned about weapons and explosives, followed by training in Karachi, Pakistan, where they learned about "Western culture and travel". Afterwards, they went to Kuala Lumpur, Malaysia for exercises in airport security and surveillance. Part of the training in Malaysia included boarding flights operated by US carriers so they could observe pre-boarding security screenings, flight crew movements around the cabin, and the timing of cabin services.

A month before the attacks, Marwan al-Shehhi purchased two  pocket knives from a Sports Authority store in Boynton Beach, Florida, while Banihammad bought a two-piece "snap" utility knife set at a Wal-Mart, and Hamza al-Ghamdi bought a Leatherman Wave multi-tool. The hijackers arrived in Boston from Florida between September 7 and 9.

Flight

The flight was operated by a Boeing 767-200, registration number N612UA, built and delivered to United Airlines in February 1983, with capacity of 168 passengers (10 in first class, 32 in business class, and 126 in economy class). On the day of the attacks, the flight carried only 56 passengers and 9crew, which represented a 33 percent load factorwell below the average load factor of 49 percent in the three months preceding September11. The youngest person on Flight175 was Christine Hanson, aged two and a half, and the oldest was 82-year-old Dorothy DeAraujo of Long Beach, California. Among the other passengers were hockey scout Garnett Bailey, and former athlete Mark Bavis.

The nine crew members included Captain Victor Saracini (51), First Officer Michael Horrocks (38), purser Kathryn Laborie, and flight attendants Robert Fangman, Amy Jarret, Amy King, Alfred Marchand, Michael Tarrou, and Alicia Titus.

Boarding

Hamza al-Ghamdi and Ahmed al-Ghamdi checked out of their hotel and called a taxi to take them to Logan International Airport in Boston, Massachusetts. They arrived at the United Airlines counter in Terminal C at 06:20 Eastern Time and Ahmed al-Ghamdi checked two bags. Both hijackers indicated they wanted to purchase tickets, even though they already had paper tickets, which were purchased approximately 2 weeks before the attacks. They had trouble answering the standard security questions, so the counter agent repeated the questions very slowly until satisfied with their responses. Hijacker pilot Marwan al-Shehhi checked a single bag at 06:45, and the other remaining hijackers, Fayez Banihammad and Mohand al-Shehri, checked in at 06:53; Banihammad checked two bags. None of the Flight 175 hijackers were selected for extra scrutiny by the Computer Assisted Passenger Prescreening System (CAPPS).

Shehhi and the other hijackers boarded Flight175 between 07:23 and 07:28. Banihammad boarded first and sat in first class seat 2A, while Mohand al-Shehri was in seat 2B. At 07:27, Shehhi and Ahmed al-Ghamdi boarded and sat in business class seats 6C and 9D, respectively. One minute later, Hamza al-Ghamdi boarded and sat in 9C.

The flight was scheduled to depart at 08:00 for Los Angeles. Fifty-one passengers and the five hijackers boarded the 767 through Terminal C's Gate 19. The plane pushed back at 07:58 and took off at 08:14 from Runway 9, about the same time Flight11 was hijacked. At 08:37, air traffic controllers asked the pilots of Flight175 whether they could see American Airlines Flight 11. The crew first responded saying they could not locate the hijacked plane but would continue looking. The pilots declared that they had heard a suspicious transmission from Flight11 upon takeoff. "Sounds like someone keyed the mic and said 'Everyone, stay in your seats'," the flight crew reported. This was the last transmission from Flight175.

Hijacking
Flight 175 was hijacked between 08:42 and 08:46, while Flight11 was just minutes away from hitting the North Tower. It is believed that hijackers Banihammad and al-Shehri forcibly entered the cockpit and attacked the pilots while the al-Ghamdis commanded passengers and crew to the aft of the cabin and al-Shehhi took over the controls. Knives were used to stab the flight crew and kill both pilots. One passenger also reported, during a phone call, the use of mace and bomb threats. The first operational evidence that something was abnormal on Flight175 came at 08:47, when the plane's transponder signal changed twice within the span of one minute, and the aircraft began deviating from its assigned course. However, the air traffic controller in charge of the flight did not notice until minutes later at 08:51. Unlike Flight11, which had turned its transponder off, Flight175's flight data could still be properly monitored. Also, at 08:51, Flight175 changed altitude. Over the next three minutes, the controller made five unsuccessful attempts to contact Flight175 and worked to move other aircraft in the vicinity away from Flight175. At 08:55 a supervisor at the New York Air Traffic Control Center notified the center's operations manager of the Flight175 hijacking. Dave Bottigliathe controller who was handling both Flight11 and Flight175remarked, "We might have a hijack over here, two of them."

Near-misses
Around this time, the flight had a near midair collision with Delta Air Lines Flight2315 flying from Hartford to Tampa, reportedly missing the plane by only . Bottiglia yelled at the Delta pilot to make collision avoidance maneuvers, adding, "I think [Flight 175] has been hijacked. I don’t know his intentions. Take any evasive action necessary." Moments before Flight175 crashed, it narrowly avoided colliding with Midwest Express Flight7, which was flying from Milwaukee to New York.

Calls
Flight attendant Robert Fangman and passengers Peter Hanson and Brian David Sweeney made phone calls from GTE airphones in the rear of the aircraft. Airphone records also indicate that passenger Garnet Bailey made four phone call attempts to his wife.

At 08:52, Robert Fangman called a United Airlines maintenance office in San Francisco and spoke with Marc Policastro. Fangman reported the hijacking and said the hijackers were likely flying the plane. He mentioned that both pilots were dead and that a flight attendant had been stabbed. After a minute and 15 seconds, the call was disconnected. Policastro subsequently made attempts to contact the aircraft's cockpit using the Aircraft Communication Addressing and Reporting System (ACARS) message system. He wrote, "I heard of a reported incident aboard your acft [aircraft]. Plz verify all is normal." He received no reply.

Brian David Sweeney tried calling his wife, Julie, at 08:59, but ended up leaving a message letting her know the plane had been hijacked. He then called his parents at 09:00 and spoke with his mother, Louise. Sweeney told his mother about the hijacking and mentioned that passengers were considering storming the cockpit and taking control of the aircraft. Concerned that the hijackers would return, he informed her that he might have to hang up quickly. After saying their goodbyes, he hung up.

At 08:52, Peter Hanson called his father, Lee Hanson, in Easton, Connecticut. Hanson was traveling with his wife, Sue, and their two-year-old daughter, Christine, the youngest victim of the September 11 attacks. The family was originally seated in Row 19, in seats C, D, and E; however, Peter placed the call to his father from seat 30E. Speaking softly, Hanson said the hijackers had commandeered the cockpit, a flight attendant had been stabbed, and that possibly someone else in the front of the aircraft had been killed. He also said the plane was flying erratically. Hanson asked his father to contact United Airlines, but Lee could not get through and instead called the police.

Peter Hanson made a second phone call to his father at 09:00:
It's getting bad, Dad. A stewardess was stabbed. They seem to have knives and Mace. They said they have a bomb. It's getting very bad on the plane. Passengers are throwing up and getting sick. The plane is making jerky movements. I don't think the pilot is flying the plane. I think we are going down. I think they intend to go to Chicago or someplace and fly into a building. Don't worry, Dad. If it happens, it'll be very fast... Oh, my God... oh, my God, oh, my God.

As the call abruptly ended, Hanson's father heard a woman screaming. He then switched on the television and witnessed as the plane struck the South Tower.

Crash
At 08:58, Flight175 was over New Jersey at 28,500 feet, heading toward New York City. In the five minutes from approximately 08:58 when Shehhi completed the final turn toward New York City until the moment of impact, the plane was in a sustained power dive, descending more than 24,000 feet in 5minutes 4seconds, at an average rate of over 5,000 feet per minute. Bottiglia reported he and his colleagues "were counting down the altitudes, and they were descending, right at the end, at 10,000 feet per minute. That is absolutely unheard of for a commercial jet."

As the plane approached New York City, Shehhi would have seen the fire and smoke pouring from the North Tower in the distance. The aircraft was in a banking left turn in its final moments, as it appeared the plane might have otherwise missed the building or merely scraped it with a wing. Therefore, those who were on the left side of the plane would also have had a clear view of the towers approaching, with one burning. At 09:01, two minutes before impact as Flight175 continued its descent into Lower Manhattan, the New York Center alerted another nearby Air Traffic Facility responsible for low-flying aircraft, which was able to monitor the aircraft's path over New Jersey, and then over Staten Island and Upper New York Bay in its final moments.

By the time Flight 175 struck the South Tower, millions of people worldwide were tuned in watching as multiple media organizations were already covering the crash of Flight11 into the North Tower 17 minutes earlier. The image of Flight175's crash was thus caught on video from multiple vantage points on live television and amateur video, while approximately a hundred cameras captured Flight175 in photographs before it crashed. Video footage of the crash was replayed numerous times in news broadcasts on the day of the attacks and in the days that followed, before major news networks put restrictions on use of the footage. The initial assumption by many was that Flight 11's crash into the North Tower had been an accident, a mistaken belief that also hindered the process of immediately evacuating the South Tower after the castastrophic damage done to the North. The sight of Flight 175 deliberately crashing into the South Tower in full view of the New York skyline less than 20 minutes after the same thing happened to its twin confirmed to the entire world it was a terrorist attack.

The impact of Flight 175 also did some minor damage to the already-burning North Tower, as some windows on east face nearest to the South Tower were seen to have shattered the moment the pressure wave generated by the fireball hit them, something which may have aggravated the fires in that building. Three floor beams of the top floor of the building were destroyed, causing major structural damage.

Collapse
Unlike at the North Tower, one of the three stairwells (A) was still intact after Flight175 crashed into the South Tower. This was because the plane struck the tower offset from the center and not centrally as Flight11 in the North Tower had done. Only 18 people passed the impact zone through the available stairway and left the South Tower safely before it collapsed, although the 9/11 Commission speculated that there may have been others who were in the process of descending from above the point of impact, only to be caught in the collapse before they could escape. On the 81st floor, only one person survived: Stanley Praimnath, whose office was sliced by the wing of the plane. He witnessed Flight175 coming toward him. No one who was at, above or immediately below the impact zone in the North Tower was able to escape.

With approximately 600 people at or above Floor 77, it is estimated that around half of them were killed instantly at the moment of impact. Although not necessarily trapped by the damage done by Flight 175’s impact, the roughly 300 survivors of the crash were either unaware of or unable to escape using the single intact stairwell and subsequently died from smoke inhalation, fires, or the eventual collapse. The smoke and flames also caused at least three people to jump or fall to their deaths from the upper floors of the South Tower, inadvertently causing the death of another man at street level. Some people above the impact zone made their way upward toward the roof in hopes of a helicopter rescue. However, access doors to the roof were locked; in any case, thick smoke and intense heat prevented rescue helicopters from landing.

Flight 175's crash into the South Tower was faster and lower down than that of the North Tower, compromising its structural integrity more. With 24 floors above the South Tower's impact zone compared to the North Tower's 10, there was far more structural weight pressing down on a damaged section of the building on fire. The South Tower collapsed at 09:58:59, after burning for 55 minutes, being the first of the two skyscrapers to collapse despite being the second to be hit, and only burning for around half the amount of time as the North Tower did before it fell.

Aftermath
The flight recorder for Flight175, as with Flight11's, was never found. Some debris from Flight175 was recovered nearby, including landing gear found on top of a building on the corner of West Broadway and Park Place, an engine found at Church and Murray Street, and a section of the fuselage which landed on top of 5 World Trade Center. In April 2013, a piece of the inboard wing flap mechanism from a Boeing 767 was discovered wedged between two buildings at Park Place.

During the recovery process, small fragments were identified from some passengers on Flight175, including a  piece of bone belonging to Peter Hanson, and small bone fragments of Lisa Frost. In 2008, the remains of Flight175 passenger Alona Abraham were identified using DNA samples. Remains of many others aboard Flight175 were never recovered.

Shortly after September 11, the number for future flights on the same route was changed from 175 to 1525. Since then, United Airlines has renumbered and rescheduled all flights from Boston to Los Angeles. United Airlines Flight311 now operates the Boston to LAX route, leaving at 08:30 and is operated by a Boeing 737 MAX 9. It was reported in May 2011 that United was reactivating flight numbers 175 and 93 as a codeshare operated by Continental, sparking an outcry from some in the media and the labor union representing United pilots. However, United said the reactivation was a mistake and said the numbers were "inadvertently reinstated", and would not be reactivated.

The names of the victims of Flight175 are inscribed at the National September 11 Memorial & Museum.

The federal government provided financial aida minimum of $500,000for the families of victims who died in the attack. Individuals who accepted funds from the government were required to forfeit their ability to sue any entity for damages. More than $7 billion has been paid out to victims by the September 11th Victim Compensation Fund, although that figure includes damages to those who were injured or killed on the other hijacked flights or the towers. In total, lawsuits were filed on behalf of 96 people against the airline and associated companies. The vast majority were settled under terms that were not made public, but the total compensation is estimated to be around $500 million. Only one lawsuit progressed to a civil trial; a wrongful death filing by the family of Mark Bavis against the airline, Boeing, and the airport's security company. This was eventually settled in September 2011. US President George Bush, other top officials, and various government agencies were also sued by Ellen Mariani, widow of passenger Louis Neil Mariani. Her cases were deemed to be frivolous.

See also

 American Airlines Flight 11
 American Airlines Flight 77 
 List of aircraft hijackings
 United Airlines Flight 93

References

Notes

Citations

Sources

External links

 The Final 9/11 Commission Report (Archive)
 CNN September 11 Memorial page, with passenger and crew lists (Archive)
 Government Releases Detailed Information on 9/11 Crashes
 Picture of aircraft Pre 9/11
 September 11, 2001 archive of United Airlines site with condolences for deceased (Archive)
 Page with additional information, from September 12, 2001 (Archive)

 
2001 fires in the United States
2001 in New York City
2001 in Massachusetts
Accidents and incidents involving the Boeing 767
Aircraft hijackings in the United States
Airliner accidents and incidents caused by hijacking
Airliner accidents and incidents in New York City
Airliner accidents and incidents involving deliberate crashes
Airliners involved in the September 11 attacks
Attacks in the United States in 2001
Aviation accidents and incidents in the United States in 2001
Disasters in New York City
Filmed murder–suicides
Islamic terrorism in the United States
Mass murder in New York (state)
Murder–suicides in New York City
Murder in New York City
Mass murder in 2001
2001 murders in the United States
Logan International Airport
Terrorist incidents in the United States in 2001
175
World Trade Center
Aviation accidents and incidents in 2001
Mass murder in New York City